Addicted to Music is the fourth studio album by German DJ and remixer ATB. It was released in 2003 and includes songs such as "I Don't Wanna Stop", "Long Way Home", "In Love with the DJ", & "Sunset Girl". The first two were released as singles from this album, both with promotional videos, while the third was released as a remix-single, from The DJ in the Mix compilation.

The same year ATB also released his first DVD, Addicted to Music. The disc includes all his videos from 1998 to 2003 (excluding "Long Way Home"), a US tour documentary, interviews, lyrics, photos and the making of the "I Don't Wanna Stop" video.

Track listing

Charts

References

External links
 Addicted to Music at The ATB Experience

ATB albums
2003 albums